Nuclear Dream (also known as Отложенное возмездие, 'Delayed revenge')  is a post-nuclear fiction novel by Sergei Lukyanenko, written in 1990 in Alma-Ata. It is part of the Nuclear Dream collection published in 2002. The entire work has been said to be an allegory of colonisation.

Plot introduction 
On the post-nuclear landscape of the United States, it is hard to survive. The most ruthless individuals are dragons, who reject their own humanity, as well as the notion of kindness.

Those who survived in underground bunkers don't like to visit the surface because life there is so brutal. However, the protagonist knows of an automated missile base that is programmed to perform a delayed nuclear strike — delayed to twenty years after the War, a time that is quickly approaching.

Mike, a man from "Reserv-6", meets Drago, a "dragon" who can communicate telepathically with his dog, Prince. As the three journey to stop the missile — aimed at Russia — from launching, Drago learns much about himself that he didn't know, and, by the end, questions his status as a dragon altogether.

Awards and nominations 
The novel was awarded the "Start" Aelita award.

1990 novels
Post-apocalyptic novels
Russian adventure novels
Novels by Sergey Lukyanenko
20th-century Russian novels